Josh Harper is an American football player.

Josh Harper may also refer to:

Josh Harper, character in Mates, Dates series
Josh Harper, character in The Client List played by Matthew Del Negro